Sambanova is the debut album by Australian dance music duo, Pnau, it was released in July 1999 on the independent Peking Duck label. However, the album was pulled from record stores due to uncleared samples, Warner Music Australasia re-released it in August 2001 with a different track listing, and it peaked in the Top 40 on the ARIA Albums Chart.

The album won an  ARIA Music Awards for Best Dance Release at the ARIA Music Awards of 2000.

Background
Pnau released their debut album Sambanova in July 1999 under the small independent Peking Duck label. It was recorded in a bedroom studio and Pnau declared they only expected to sell "a few thousand copies". It was re-released in June 2000 by Warner Music Australasia however the album was pulled from record stores for uncleared samples and re-released in an altered format by Warner Music Australasia in August 2001. In a 2003 interview with The Age newspaper's Andrew Drever, Mayes recalled that they had no understanding of sample clearances due to their naivety in the music business.

Pnau toured nationally for the Big Day Out in 2001, 2004, 2008 and 2011.

Track listing
Three full length versions of Sambanova have been released to the public, one through the label Peking Duck and two through Warner Music Australasia.

Peking Duck version
 Sambanova (1999, CD format, released by Peking Duck, DUCKCD001)

2000 version
 Sambanova (2000, CD format, had video on it, rereleased by Warner Music Australasia, 8573831942)

2001 version
 Sambanova (July 2001, CD format, has 3 bonus tracks, released by Warner Music Australasia, 8573883392)

Personnel
Pnau members
Nick Littlemore – vocals, drums, percussion, synthesiser, keyboards, trombone, melodica, clavi
Peter Mayes – guitars, vocals, bass guitar, synthesiser, keyboards, melodica, keytar

Additional musicians
Paul Johannessen – electric piano (Fender Rhodes)
Gawain McGrath – guitar

Charts

References

1999 debut albums
ARIA Award-winning albums
Pnau albums